Rita Briansky (born July 25, 1925) is a Polish-born Canadia painter and printmaker. Briansky is associated with the Jewish Painters of Montreal.

Early life
Briansky emigrated to Ontario, Canada with her mother and two sisters in 1929.
The year they arrived, the family moved to Ansonville in northern Ontario, then Val d'Or, Quebec in 1939, and then to Montreal in 1941. She studied with Alexander Bercovitch at the Y.W.H.A. (1941-1942); the Montreal Museum of Fine Arts with Jacques de Tonnancour (1942-4); the Montreal School of Fine Arts with M. Carpentier (1944-1946); and the Art Students League, New York with Jan Carbino, Louis Bosa, H. Sternberg and V. Vytlacil (1946-1948) in New York City.

Career
Briansky has a wide range of work: paintings, drawings, watercolours, pastels and prints. She held solo shows at the Montreal Museum of Fine Arts (1957), (1962); and the Glenhyrst Arts Council, Brantford, Ontario (1965) (now the Glenhyrst Art Gallery of Brant) as well as many commercial galleries. Her group shows have included the Second International Biennial Exhibition of Prints, Tokyo and Osaka, Japan (1960-1961) and the United Nations, N.Y. (1965). In 1995, following travels in Poland to her birthplace and memorial sites, Briansky created the Kaddish Series, reflecting on the tragedy of the Holocaust. This series (the Jewish Prayer for the Dead) is on permanent display at the Jewish General Hospital in Montreal. 

Her work is included in the collections of the National Gallery of Canada, the
Musée national des beaux-arts du Québec, the Art Gallery of Hamilton, the Burnaby Art Gallery the Cape Breton University Art Gallery, the Winnipeg Art Gallery, the Vancouver Art Gallery, and many others. She also illustrated an anthology of children’s short stories for the Gage Publishing Company called Rubaboo 4.

Briansky was a member of the Canadian Painter-Etchers and Engravers Society, and the Canadian Society of Graphic Art.
A full-length feature film The Wonder and Amazement - Rita Briansky on Her Life in Art was made by Janet Best and Dov Okouneff on her life and art in 2018.

For more than 45 years, she has worked as a teacher, both of art history and studio art.

References

1925 births
Living people
20th-century Canadian women artists
21st-century Canadian women artists
Polish emigrants to Canada
Canadian printmakers
Jewish Canadian artists
Jewish painters
20th-century Canadian Jews
21st-century Canadian Jews
Canadian women painters
Women printmakers
20th-century Canadian painters
20th-century Canadian printmakers
Artists from Montreal
Canadian art educators
Jews and Judaism in Montreal